Keith Anthony Staten (born January 25, 1964) is an American gospel musician. He started his solo music career, in 1990, with the release of, From the Heart, by Lection Records. This was his breakthrough release upon the Billboard magazine Gospel Albums chart. His subsequent album, No Greater Love, was released in 1995 by Glorious Music, but it failed to chart. The third album, Worship in the House, was released by Word Records in tandem with Epic Records in 1996, and this album charted on the Christian Albums chart. He released, Glory in the House, in 1995 with the aforementioned labels, however this time around it charted on the Gospel Albums chart.

Early life
Staten was born as Keith Anthony Staten, on January 25, 1964, in the city of Detroit, Michigan, whose father was a pastor.

Music career
Keith Staten was the lead vocalist for Commissioned from 1982 until 1990, when he left to pursue his solo career. The first solo album, From the Heart, was released on August 21, 1990 by Lection Records, and this album was his breakthrough release upon the Billboard magazine Gospel Albums chart at No. 25. He released, No Greater Love, on March 21, 1995 with Glorious Music, however this album did not place on any charts. His third album, Worship in the House, was released by Word Records alongside Epic Records on November 5, 1996, and this album placed on the Billboard magazine Christian Albums chart at No. 29. The latest album, Glory in the House'', was released on April 20, 1999 by the aforementioned record labels, and this time around the album charted on the Gospel Albums chart at No. 17.

Personal life
Staten has been married to his wife for over 25 years, Marketa, and together they have a mid-twenties aged son, Anthony, which they reside in Orlando, Florida.

Discography

References

External links
 Cross Rhythms artist profile

1964 births
Living people
African-American songwriters
African-American Christians
Musicians from Detroit
Musicians from Orlando, Florida
Songwriters from Michigan
Songwriters from Florida
21st-century African-American people
20th-century African-American people